The Fàn Clan established itself as one of the six most powerful clans within the State of Jin during the Spring and Autumn period of ancient China. The clans were collectively called the "Six Titled Retainers".  These six aristocratic families dominated Jin in the late Spring and Autumn period, basically using the ruling duke as a figurehead until Jin was split into three separate states.

Shi Hui (士会, posthumously called Fàn Wuzi (范武子)), great-grandson of Du Bo Duke of Tangdu is considered the founder. He  distinguished himself by defeating the neighboring tribes as Commander in Chief of the Jin army and was ennobled as Duke of Sui and Duke of Fàn. He gains the title Fàn Hui(范会), and is rewarded with lands southeast of Fàn (now Fan County Fànxian 范縣 in Henan)

In 497 BC a dispute broke out between the Zhao clan, and the Fan and Zhonghang clans. The Fan and Zhonghang forces attacked Zhao,but were defeated and forced to retreat to the city of Zhaoge as the other three other clans (Han, Wei, and Zhi) came to Zhao's defence. Seven years later, in 490 BC the combined Jin forces decisively defeated Fan Jishe and Zhonghang Yin, leaders of their respective clans, forcing them to flee to the State of Qi. Later the Han, Zhao, and Wei clans would grow stronger leading to the partition Jin from 481 BCE into the new states of Han, Zhao, and Wei and finally destruction of the Jin State in 386 BCE.

The line of descent is as given in the table below:

See also 
 Fan (surname).

References

Works cited
 

Jin (Chinese state)